Jefferson Y. "Jeff" Han (born 1975) is a computer scientist who worked for New York University's (NYU) Courant Institute of Mathematical Sciences until 2006. He is one of the main developers of "multi-touch sensing", which, unlike older touch-screen interfaces, is able to recognize multiple points of contact.

Han also works on other projects in the fields of autonomous robot navigation, motion capture, real-time computer graphics, and human-computer interaction.

Career
He presented his multi-touch sensing work in February 2006 at the TED (Technology Entertainment Design) Conference in Monterey, California. TED released the video online six months later and it spread quickly on YouTube.

Han founded a company called Perceptive Pixel to develop his touch screen technology further, and he has already shipped touch screens to parts of the military. Han's technology has been featured most notably as the "Magic Wall" on CNN's Election Center coverage. Han's company was acquired by Microsoft in 2012, where he became Partner General Manager of Perceptive Pixel (later Surface Hub). Han left Microsoft in late 2015, shortly before Surface Hub's launch.

Personal life
He is the son of middle-class Korean immigrants who emigrated to the United States in the 1970s.

Education
Han graduated from The Dalton School in New York in 1993 and studied computer science and electrical engineering for three years at Cornell University before leaving to join a start-up company to commercialize the CU-SeeMe video-conferencing software that he helped develop while an undergraduate at Cornell.

Honors
Han was named to Time magazine's 2008 listing of the "100 Most Influential People in The World".

References

External links
 Jeff Han's Multitouch Demo (II) (2007Mar21)
 Jeff Han: A year later (Wired Magazine)
 Jeff Han demonstrating multi-touch interface on big screen
 Jeff Han's 10 min Talk at TED Conference (2006) Monterey, CA
 Jeff Han homepage at NYU
 Specific Multi-Touch Sensing work – includes video
 Transcript of a presentation delivered at ETech on 7 March 2006
 Presentation over YouTube
 Perceptive Pixel
 The Untold Story of Microsoft's Surface Hub
 
 "The radical promise of the multi-touch interface" (TED2006)

American computer scientists
1975 births
Living people
Scientists from New York (state)
New York University staff
Cornell University College of Engineering alumni
Dalton School alumni